"Hooker with a Penis" is a song by the American rock band Tool. It was released on September 17, 1996, as the seventh track off their second studio album, Ænima. The song is the shortest non-segue track on the album and one of its heaviest; lyrically, the song is uncharacteristically straightforward, in contrast to the band's more progressive works.

Lyrics and music
The song begins with a story about a fan who accuses Tool of selling out. When asked if he is "sucking up to The Man", Keenan casually responds that everyone is "The Man". The intensity of the vocals and instruments are pushed to an almost comical level as proof that they have not lost their edge. One such lyric points out that "all you read and wear or see and hear on TV is a product begging for your fatass dirty dollar".

Reception

During Lollapalooza 1997, a version of "Hooker with a Penis" remixed by Billy Howerdel in the form of lounge music was played over the public address system between sets. The band played at the festival in 1997.

References

1996 songs
Tool (band) songs
Song recordings produced by David Bottrill
Songs written by Maynard James Keenan
Songs written by Danny Carey
Songs written by Justin Chancellor
Songs written by Adam Jones (musician)
Songs about prostitutes
Songs about the media